The year 2004 is the 12th year in the history of Pancrase, a mixed martial arts promotion based in Japan. In 2004 Pancrase held 16 events beginning with Pancrase: Brave 1.

Title fights

Events list

Pancrase: Brave 1

Pancrase: Brave 1 was an event held on February 6, 2004, at Korakuen Hall in Tokyo, Japan.

Results

Pancrase: Brave 2

Pancrase: Brave 2 was an event held on February 15, 2004, at Umeda Stella Hall in Osaka, Osaka, Japan.

Results

Pancrase: Brave 3

Pancrase: Brave 3 was an event held on March 29, 2004, at Korakuen Hall in Tokyo, Japan.

Results

Pancrase: Brave 4

Pancrase: Brave 4 was an event held on April 23, 2004, at Korakuen Hall in Tokyo, Japan.

Results

Pancrase: 2004 Neo-Blood Tournament Eliminations

Pancrase: 2004 Neo-Blood Tournament Eliminations was an event held on May 2, 2004, at Gold's Gym South Tokyo Annex in Tokyo, Japan.

Results

Pancrase: Brave 5

Pancrase: Brave 5 was an event held on May 28, 2004, at Korakuen Hall in Tokyo, Japan.

Results

Pancrase: Brave 6

Pancrase: Brave 6 was an event held on June 22, 2004, at Korakuen Hall in Tokyo, Japan.

Results

Pancrase: 2004 Neo-Blood Tournament Semifinals

Pancrase: 2004 Neo-Blood Tournament Semifinals was an event held on July 25, 2004, at Korakuen Hall in Tokyo, Japan.

Results

Pancrase: 2004 Neo-Blood Tournament Final

Pancrase: 2004 Neo-Blood Tournament Final was an event held on July 25, 2004, at Korakuen Hall in Tokyo, Japan.

Results

Pancrase: Brave 7

Pancrase: Brave 7 was an event held on August 22, 2004, at Umeda Stella Hall in Osaka, Osaka, Japan.

Results

Pancrase: Brave 8

Pancrase: Brave 8 was an event held on September 24, 2004, at Korakuen Hall in Tokyo, Japan.

Results

Pancrase: Brave 9

Pancrase: Brave 9 was an event held on October 12, 2004, at Korakuen Hall in Tokyo, Japan.

Results

Pancrase: Brave 10

Pancrase: Brave 10 was an event held on November 7, 2004, at Tokyo Bay NK Hall in Urayasu, Chiba, Japan.

Results

Pancrase: Hybrid Fight 2004

Pancrase: Hybrid Fight 2004 was an event held on November 7, 2004, at the Hybrid Wrestling Kagoshima Gym in Izumi, Kagoshima, Japan.

Results

Pancrase: Brave 11

Pancrase: Brave 11 was an event held on November 26, 2004, at Korakuen Hall in Tokyo, Japan.

Results

Pancrase: Brave 12

Pancrase: Brave 12 was an event held on December 21, 2004, at Korakuen Hall in Tokyo, Japan.

Results

See also 
 Pancrase
 List of Pancrase champions
 List of Pancrase events

References

Pancrase events
2004 in mixed martial arts